Borissiakia is an extinct genus of chalicothere, a group of herbivorous, odd-toed ungulate (perissodactyl) mammals, that lived during the late Oligocene in Kazakhstan. They had claws that were likely used in a hook-like manner to pull down branches, suggesting they lived as bipedal browsers.

References

Sources
 Classification of Mammals by Malcolm C. McKenna and Susan K. Bell

Chalicotheres
Oligocene mammals of Asia
Fossil taxa described in 1946